Cornelius Augustine McGlennon (December 10, 1878 – June 13, 1931) was an American Democratic Party politician who represented  from 1919 to 1921.

Biography
McGlennon was born in East Newark, New Jersey on December 10, 1878. Throughout his younger years he attended Holy Cross School in Harrison, New Jersey, and St. Francis Xavier's High School in Manhattan, New York City.

McGlennon later attended college and graduated from Seton Hall College in South Orange, New Jersey in 1899. After this, he became a public and high-school principal from 1901 until 1926. Cornelius also studied law at the New Jersey Law School in Newark, New Jersey before he was admitted to the bar in 1916. McGlennon practiced law in East Newark, New Jersey. Sometime afterwards, McGlennon's interest piqued in politics. McGlennon served as member of the New Jersey Senate in 1917 and 1918, and then served as Democratic floor leader in 1918. McGlennon also continued his political foray to be Mayor of East Newark, New Jersey from 1907 to 1919.

In 1918, Democrat McGlennon, then majority leader of the state senate, defeated Republican William Ross by just 299 votes out of more than 25,000 cast. McGlennon was then the elected representative to the 66th United States Congress (March 4, 1919 – March 3, 1921), representing New Jersey's 8th congressional district in the United States House of Representatives, but was an unsuccessful candidate for reelection in 1920 to the 67th United States Congress. He served as a delegate to the 1920 Democratic National Convention. In 1924, he was appointed judge of the New Jersey Court of Errors and Appeals and served until his death. Cornelius also was acting supervising principal at Harrison, New Jersey from 1926 to 1931.

He died in Newark, New Jersey on June 13, 1931 at the age of 52. McGlennon was buried in Holy Sepulchre Cemetery in East Orange, New Jersey.

References

External links

New Jersey politics article
New Jersey politics article
Political Graveyard

1878 births
1931 deaths
Mayors of places in New Jersey
Democratic Party members of the United States House of Representatives from New Jersey
New Jersey lawyers
New Jersey state court judges
Democratic Party New Jersey state senators
People from East Newark, New Jersey
Politicians from Hudson County, New Jersey
Politicians from Newark, New Jersey
Rutgers School of Law–Newark alumni
Seton Hall University alumni
Xavier High School (New York City) alumni
Burials at Holy Sepulchre Cemetery (East Orange, New Jersey)
Lawyers from Newark, New Jersey

Catholics from New Jersey